Idriz Voca (born 15 May 1997) is a professional footballer who plays as a defensive midfielder for Italian club Cosenza. Born in Switzerland, he represents Kosovo at international level.

Club career

Luzern
On 26 February 2017, Voca was named as a Luzern substitute for the first time in a Swiss Super League match against Basel. His professional debut with Luzern came on 5 April in the 2016–17 Swiss Cup semifinal against Sion after coming on as a substitute at 103rd minute of the extra time in place of Tomi Juric and the entire match finished in a goalless draw and advanced in the penalty shoot-out, where Voca scored the 6th and last penalty but Luzern lost 6–5.

Ankaragücü
On 23 September 2020, Voca signed a two-year contract with Süper Lig club Ankaragücü. Four days later, he made his debut in a 0–0 away draw against Sivasspor after coming on as a substitute at 62nd minute in place of Alper Potuk.

Cosenza
On 28 January 2022, Voca signed a two-and-a-half-year contract with Serie B club Cosenza. Two days later, he was named as a Cosenza substitute for the first time in a league match against Cittadella. His debut with Cosenza came on 5 February in a 0–0 home draw against Brescia after coming on as a substitute at 67th minute in place of Rodney Kongolo.

International career

Youth

Albania
Voca during two periods as April 2013 and January 2016 was part of Albania at youth international level, respectively has been part of the U15, and U21 teams, but failed to make his debut as both call-ups were for training camps.

Kosovo
On 29 August 2017, Voca received a call-up from Kosovo U21 for a 2019 UEFA European Under-21 Championship qualification matches against Norway U21 and Germany U21. Three days later, he made his debut with Kosovo U21 in a 2019 UEFA European Under-21 Championship qualification against Norway U21 after being named in the starting line-up.

Senior
On 19 March 2018, Voca received a call-up from Kosovo for the friendly matches against Madagascar and Burkina Faso. Five days later, he made his debut with Kosovo in a friendly match against Madagascar after coming on as a substitute at 77th minute in place of fellow debutant Edon Zhegrova.

Personal life
Voca was born in Stans, Switzerland from Kosovo Albanian father and Bosnian mother. He holds Kosovar, Albanian, and Swiss passports.

Career statistics

Club

International

References

External links

1997 births
Living people
People from Stans
Sportspeople from Nidwalden
Kosovan footballers
Kosovo under-21 international footballers
Kosovo international footballers
Kosovan expatriate footballers
Kosovan expatriate sportspeople in Turkey
Kosovan expatriate sportspeople in Italy
Swiss men's footballers
Swiss expatriate footballers
Swiss expatriate sportspeople in Turkey
Swiss expatriate sportspeople in Italy
Swiss people of Kosovan descent
Swiss people of Albanian descent
Swiss people of Bosnia and Herzegovina descent
Association football midfielders
Swiss Super League players
FC Luzern players
Süper Lig players
MKE Ankaragücü footballers
Serie B players
Cosenza Calcio players